David N. Barkhausen (born January 31, 1950) is an American politician, lawyer, and businessman.

Born in Lake Forest, Illinois, Barkhausen went to Choate Rosemary Hall in Wallingford, Connecticut. He then received his bachelor's degree from Princeton University and his Juris Doctor degree from Southern Illinois University School of Law. Barkhausen practiced law and served an Illinois assistant attorney general. He was also in the life insurance business. Barkhausen served in the Illinois House of Representatives from 1981 to 1985 and was a Republican. He then served in the Illinois Senate from 1985 to 1997. In an upset, Democratic candidate Terry Link defeated Thomas Lachner, a Republican member of the Illinois House of Representatives, to succeed Barkhausen.

Notes

1950 births
Living people
People from Lake Forest, Illinois
Choate Rosemary Hall alumni
Princeton University alumni
Southern Illinois University alumni
Businesspeople from Illinois
Illinois lawyers
Republican Party members of the Illinois House of Representatives
Republican Party Illinois state senators